The American Journal of Surgery is a peer-reviewed scientific journal published by Elsevier on behalf of 6 major surgical societies:
The Southwestern Surgical Congress
The North Pacific Surgical Association
The Association for Surgical Education
Association of Women Surgeons
Midwest Surgical Association
The Society of Black Academic Surgeons (SBAS) 

Elsevier's former sister company Cahners Publishing acquired The American Journal of Surgery's publisher Technical Publishing in 1986.

The journal publishes articles describing original research on abdominal, cancer, vascular, head and neck, breast, and colorectal surgeries.

According to Journal Citation Reports, the journal has a 2015 impact factor of 2.403. The journal's editor in chief is Kirby I. Bland of the University of Alabama.

In public media 
This journal is in Robin Cook's Coma (1978) book.

References

External links 
 

Surgery journals
English-language journals